A dosa, also called dosai, dosey, dwashi or dosha is a thin pancake in South Indian cuisine made from a fermented batter of ground black lentils and rice. Dosas are popular in South Asia as well as around the world. Dosas are served hot, often with chutney and sambar.

History

Dosas originated in South India, but its precise geographical origins are unknown. According to historian P. Thankappan Nair, dosa originated in the town of Udupi in present-day Karnataka. However, according to food historian K. T. Achaya, references in the Sangam literature suggest that dosa was already in use in the ancient Tamil country around the 1st century CE. Achaya states that the earliest written mention of dosa appears in literature of present-day Tamil Nadu, in the 8th century, while the earliest mention of dosa in the Kannada literature appears a century later.

In popular tradition, the origin of the dosa is linked to Udupi, probably because of the dish's association with Udupi restaurants. The Tamil dosai is softer and thicker. The thinner and crispier version of dosa was first made in present-day Karnataka. A recipe for dosa can be found in Manasollasa, a 12th-century Sanskrit encyclopedia compiled by Someshvara III, who ruled from present-day Karnataka.

After the Independence of India, South Indian cuisine became gradually popular in the North. In Delhi, the Madras Hotel in Connaught Place became one of the first restaurants to serve South Indian cuisine. It arrived in Mumbai with the Udupi restaurants in the 1930s.

Names 

Dosa is the anglicised name of a variety of South Indian names for the dish, for example dosai in Tamil, dosey in Kannada and dosha in Malayalam.

The standard transliterations and pronunciations of the word in various South Indian languages are as follows:

Nutrition
Dosa is high in carbohydrates and contains no added sugars or saturated fats. As its key ingredients are rice and black gram, it is a good source of protein. A typical homemade plain dosa without oil contains about 112 calories, of which 84% is carbohydrate and 16% protein. The fermentation process increases the vitamin B and vitamin C content.

Preparation 
A mixture of rice and black or green gram that has been soaked in water is ground finely to form a batter. Some add a bit of soaked fenugreek seeds. The proportion of rice to lentils is generally 3:1 or 4:1. The batter is allowed to ferment overnight, before being mixed with water to get the desired consistency. The batter is then ladled onto a hot tava or griddle greased with oil or ghee. It is spread out with the base of a ladle or bowl to form a pancake. It can be made either to be thick like a pancake, or thin and crispy. A dosa is served hot, either folded in half or rolled like a wrap. It is usually served with chutney and sambar. The mixture of black grams and rice can be replaced with highly refined wheat flour or semolina.

Serving
Dosa can be stuffed with fillings of vegetables and sauces to make a quick meal. They are typically served with a vegetarian side dish which varies according to regional and personal preferences. Common side items are:

 Sambar
 Chutney
 Idli podi or milagaipodi: a lentil powder with spices and sometimes desiccated coconut, mixed with sesame oil or groundnut oil or ghee
 Indian pickles

Variations
Masala dosa is a roasted dosa served with potato curry, chutney and sambar; while Saada (plain) dosa is prepared with lighter texture, paper dosa is a thin and crisp version. Rava dosa is made crispier using semolina. Newer versions are Chinese dosa, cheese dosa, paneer dosa, pizza dosa and so on.

Though dosa is typically made with rice and lentils, other versions exist.

Related foods
 Uttapam: a thick relatively soft crepe mostly topped with diced onions, tomatoes, cilantro or cheese, sometimes described as an Indian pizza
 Pesarattu: made from green gram in Andhra Pradesh, served with a ginger and tamarind chutney
 Appam: a pancake prepared from patted rice batter, served with sweet coconut milk
 Chakuli pitha: batter contains more black gram and less rice flour
 Apam balik: made from a mixture of flour, eggs, sugar, baking soda, coconut milk and water
 Jianbing: a Chinese dish
 Bánh xèo: a Vietnamese dish
 Lahoh: a Somali dish
 Injera: an Ethiopian dish made with fermented teff batter

See also

 List of fermented foods
 List of Indian breads
 List of pancakes
 Mangalorean cuisine
 Udupi cuisine
 Tamil cuisine
 Cuisine of Kerala

References

 
Andhra cuisine
Articles containing video clips
Burmese cuisine
Fermented foods
Indian breads
Indian fast food
Karnataka cuisine
Kerala cuisine
Malaysian breads
Mangalorean cuisine
Pancakes
Singaporean cuisine
South Indian cuisine
Sri Lankan pancakes
Tamil cuisine
Telangana cuisine
Vegetarian dishes of India